McGinty's Department Store was a general goods department store located in Neosho, Missouri, the county seat of Newton County, Missouri. McGinty's set on the south side of the Neosho square on the southeast corner of the intersection of Main and Wood streets. It is located in the Neosho Commercial Historic District, but is considered a non-contributing building.

History 
McGinty's Department Store was opened in 1904 by A.C. McGinty. In addition to running his department store, A.C. McGinty also served as the president of Neosho's First National Bank. 

In 1939, A.C. McGinty's son Hale McGinty began working at the department store and remained in active management until 1991, when his family sold their active share of the business. The McGinty name remained on the business until 2001. 

The McGinty family had also at one time been part owners of the McGinty-Frohlich Department Store in Monett, Missouri, which is now Brownsberger's Clothing.

References 

Defunct department stores based in Missouri
Retail companies established in 1904
Clothing retailers of the United States
Retail companies disestablished in 2001
Defunct companies based in Missouri